Keith Ferrazzi is an American author and entrepreneur. He is the founder and CEO of Ferrazzi Greenlight, a Los Angeles, California-based research and consulting firm. He wrote the New York Times bestselling books Never Eat Alone and Who's Got Your Back? Keith Ferrazzi first created the term co-elevation in 2017, as he was writing the book, Leading Without Authority: How Co-Elevation Is Redefining Collaboration and Transforming Our Teams, with the publisher Penguin Random House.

Early life and education
Ferrazzi was born and grew up in Pennsylvania. He attended Yale University, where he founded the Sigma Chi chapter there, and Harvard Business School.

Career 

After graduating from Harvard, he joined management consulting firm Deloitte as an entry level analyst, and rose to become the company's chief marketing officer (CMO). At age 32, he was hired by Starwood as CMO, reportedly the youngest CMO in the Fortune 500 at the time. In 2000, he left to found YaYa Media, an entertainment and marketing company, which he sold to investment company American Vantage in 2003.

Ferrazzi left YaYa Media to found Ferrazzi Greenlight, a Los Angeles-based strategic consulting firm, and its associated Greenlight Research Institute.  The company and institute focus on the importance of positive relationships to business success.

Books

Ferrazzi has written two networking books that were New York Times bestsellers.

His first book, Never Eat Alone, was based on his networking experiences, and was published in 2005.

His second book, Who's Got Your Back?, followed up and expanded on the themes from his first book, and was published in 2009.

In 2020, he wrote a new book, Leading Without Authority. Keith Ferrazzi discusses how "co-elevation" will transform peers into joint task teammates.

References

External links
 

Year of birth missing (living people)
Living people
American business writers
American chief executives
Place of birth missing (living people)
Yale University alumni
Harvard Business School alumni